Marsh's Library, situated in St. Patrick's Close, adjacent to St. Patrick's Cathedral, Dublin, Ireland is a well-preserved library of the late Renaissance and early Enlightenment. When it opened to the public in 1707 it was the first public library in Ireland. It was built to the order of Archbishop Narcissus Marsh and has a collection of over 25,000 books and 300 manuscripts.

History

Foundation

The library was built for the Most Rev. Narcissus Marsh, Church of Ireland Archbishop of Dublin, and formerly Provost of Trinity College, Dublin. It was long claimed that the Library opened in 1701, but this is untrue. The Cathedral agreed in 1701 to provide a plot of land for a library, but building work only commenced in 1703. The First Gallery and the Old Reading Room seem to have been completed by 1705. The library was formally established by an Act of the Irish Parliament in 1707 (6 Anne c. 19), and the Second Gallery was added in 1708 or 1709.

The design was by the then Surveyor General of Ireland, Sir William Robinson, also the architect of the Royal Hospital Kilmainham. Marsh donated his own library, which included the former library of Bishop Edward Stillingfleet, of over 10,000 volumes, regarded as one of the finest in England, which he had bought for 2,500 pounds.

Dr. Elias Bouhereau, a Huguenot refugee from La Rochelle who fled from France after the Revocation of the edict of Nantes, was the first librarian or Keeper, and also donated his personal library.

The Library was formally incorporated in 1707 by Parliament, which vested the house and books in a body known as the Governors and Guardians of the Library, comprising religious and state dignitaries and officials, and their successors still oversee it.  Narcissus Marsh died in 1713, and is buried just beyond the library, in the grounds of the cathedral.

In 1745, John Stearne, Bishop of Clogher, bequeathed half of his collection of books to the library. The other half of Stearne's book collection (and all of his manuscripts) were given to Trinity College, Dublin.

Recent history
In 1989, Muriel McCarthy became the first female Keeper, holding the position until her retirement in 2011. The current Keeper (now re-titled as Director) is Dr Jason McElligott, who was educated at University College Dublin and St John's College, Cambridge.

When the Guinness family sold Farmleigh House to the State, the Benjamin Iveagh Library was donated to Marsh's Library, although its documents remain housed at Farmleigh.

The catalogue of the library is online at www.marshlibrary.ie/catalogue. Scholars and students can read the books and manuscripts by appointment. Tourists come from across the world to see the old library, and in 2013 there were a total of 16,000 tourist visitors. The figure for 2014 was 17,000 visitors. 2015 saw a rise in visitors to 23,000 people.

Holdings
The library contains over 25,000 books from the 16th, 17th and 18th centuries, in addition to around 300 manuscripts, and around 80 books (incunabula) from before 1501. Subjects covered include medicine, law, science, travel, navigation, mathematics, music, surveying and classical literature, and especially theology.

In addition to the eighty books dated before 1501, the Marsh collection contains four hundred and thirty books from Italy dated before 1600, twelve hundred English works produced before 1640, as well as another five thousand English books printed before 1700. Marsh’s collection also includes Irish manuscripts purchased from Dudley Loftus in 1695. The Loftus acquisition included many works of Irish History, an Irish – Latin Dictionary from 1662, royal grants in Ireland from 1604 to 1631, and letters of Thady O’Doyne from 1159, 1590, and 1606. In 1941, Dean Webster donated a collection of Irish manuscripts and deeds and relating to County Cork as well as the Bishop William Reeves’ collection of books and manuscripts.

The Marsh collection includes works in oriental languages, and in Hebrew, Arabic, Turkish and Russian, as well as an important collection of Latin Judaica. The Marsh collection of Jewish texts which were primarily his own personal books contain over two hundred and fifty works of Hebrew Bibles, writings from the Talmud, rabbinic works, and Yiddish books. Many of Marsh’s personal collection of Hebrew works as well as oriental texts were purchased from the estate of the Edward Stillingfleet (1635-1699), a Protestant clergyman and lecturer. The Marsh Middle Eastern personal collection is robust in Near Eastern languages, biblical studies, philosophy, astronomy, and math.

The Bouhéreau collection relates especially to France, and French religious controversies, and also medicine. The collection of Elie Bouhereau, the first librarian of the Marsh Library, donated about 1703, is quite diverse. Covering multiple subjects many of his works were gifts from authors and religious leaders such as William Molyneux, Bishop Wettenhall, and Archbishop William King. The Bouhereau medical texts were the most updated works of the day and the French History works included the Massacre of St. Bartholomew’s Day and the Siege of La Rochelle.

Among the manuscripts is a volume of the Lives of the Irish Saints in Latin from ca. 1400, as well as 16th century madrigals and other musical pieces, and manuscripts on theological, legal and medical matters.

Interior design
The library still features its original fittings, including seating and shelving. The bookcases are made of quarter-plained Baltic oak with carved and lettered gables. In some of the bookcases there are bullet holes from the Easter Rising when Jacob's Biscuit factory next door was occupied. There are three wire alcoves, known as 'cages', which came into use in the 1770s in response to thefts in the library.

Today
The library is one of the last 18th-century buildings in Ireland still used for its original purpose. It is open to visitors for a fee of €5, or €3 for students and senior citizens. Please see https://www.marshlibrary.ie/visit for current opening hours.

Researchers are admitted free of charge, but must apply in advance to reserve a place in the Reading Room. The reading room is expected to be closed until October 1, 2020.

The Library holds exhibitions, and occasional conferences, and has published a range of material, primarily related to exhibitions and the catalogue.

As a charitable institution the library accepts donations, which are recorded in a special ledger which dates back to 1707.

The Library has an active social media presence, and every day posts at least one image from the collections on Instagram, Facebook and Twitter. These images give a sense of the breadth and depth of the Library holdings.

See also
Bolton Library

References and notes

External links

 
 Digitized manuscripts from Marsh's Library at ISOS (Irish Script on Screen)

Library buildings completed in the 18th century
Archives in the Republic of Ireland
Libraries in Dublin (city)
Buildings and structures completed in 1707
Cultural infrastructure completed in 1707
Museums in Dublin (city)
1700s establishments in Ireland
1707 establishments in the British Empire
Libraries established in 1707